The 62nd Army was a field army established by the Soviet Union's Red Army during the Second World War.

History

The Army was formed on 28 May 1942 as the 7th Reserve Army, a part of the Reserve of the Supreme High Command. The formation was then re-designated as the 62nd Army little more than a month later in July 1942.

From mid August 1942 until late January 1943, the 62nd Army, under the command of General Vasily Chuikov, fought in the Battle of Stalingrad. 62nd Army conducted an epic defense of the city against repeated and desperate attacks by the German 6th Army. The Army, along with the 64th Army, was operating under the Soviet Stalingrad Front. After the German assault at Stalingrad had come to utter disaster, the 62nd Army was uniquely awarded the Order of Lenin, and granted Guards status as the 8th Guards Army.

On 13 September 1942 the Army composition was:
33rd, 35th Guards, 87th, 98th, 112th, 131st, 196th, 229th, 244th, 315th, 399th Rifle Divisions
10th, 38th, 42nd, 115th, 124th, 129th, 149th Rifle Brigades post 9-27-1942 193rd Rifle Division
23rd Tank Corps
20th Tank Destroyer Brigade
115th Fortified Region
twelve artillery and mortar regiments
(Note: 33rd Guards, 87th and 229th rifle divisions were in the process of being brought up to strength; 131st and 399th rifle divisions were held in the second echelon of the Army.)

On 1 November 1942 during the height of the Battle of Stalingrad, the 62nd Army commanded the 13th, 37th, and 39th Guards Rifle Divisions, the 45th, 95th, 112th, 138th, 193rd, 284th and 308th Rifle Divisions, the 42nd, 92nd, 115th, 124th, 149th, and 160th Rifle Brigades, the 84th Tank and 2nd Motor Rifle Brigades, the 115th Fortified Region, and 20 regiments of howitzer, gun, antitank, mortar, rocket, and anti-aircraft artillery among other support units. Many of these formations were burnt-out shells by the end of the Battle of Stalingrad, with many formations reduced to less than 5% of its original manpower.

On 16 April 1943, the 62nd Army was granted Guards status and transformed into the 8th Guards Army.

Commanders
Jul 1942 to Aug 1942: Major General V. Ia. Kolpakchi
Aug 1942 to Sep 1942: Lieutenant General A. I. Lopatin
Sep 1942 to Apr 1943: Lieutenant General V. I. Chuikov

Notes

References
 

062
Military units and formations established in 1942
Military units and formations disestablished in 1943